Pretty Baby is a 1978 American historical drama film directed by Louis Malle, written by Polly Platt, and starring Brooke Shields, Keith Carradine, and Susan Sarandon. Set in 1917, it focuses on a 12-year-old girl being raised in a brothel in the Storyville red-light district of New Orleans by her prostitute mother, and who eventually becomes a child prostitute herself. Barbara Steele, Diana Scarwid, and Antonio Fargas appear in supporting roles. The film is based on the true account of a young girl who was forced into prostitution by her mother, which was recounted in historian Al Rose's 1974 book Storyville, New Orleans: Being an Authentic Illustrated Account of the Notorious Red-Light District, as well as the life of photographer Ernest Bellocq, who photographed various New Orleans prostitutes in the early-twentieth century. Its title is derived from the Tony Jackson song of the same name, which is used in the soundtrack. 

The project marked Malle's first American film production, as his previous works had been produced in his native France. Filming took place on location in New Orleans in the spring of 1977.

The film was released theatrically in the United States in April 1978, and screened at the 1978 Cannes Film Festival, where it was nominated for the Palme d’Or and won the Technical Grand Prize. Ferdinand Morton's score also earned the film an Academy Award nomination for Best Music. Although the film was mostly praised by critics, it caused significant controversy due to its depiction of child prostitution and the on-screen nudity of Shields, who was 12 years old at the time of filming.

Plot
In 1917, during the last months of legal prostitution in Storyville, the red-light district of New Orleans, Louisiana, Hattie is a prostitute working at an elegant brothel run by the elderly, cocaine-addicted Madame Nell. Hattie has given birth to a baby boy and has a 12-year-old daughter, Violet, who lives in the house. When photographer Ernest Bellocq arrives with his camera, Hattie and Violet are the only people awake. He asks to be allowed to take photographs of the women. Madame Nell agrees only after he offers to pay.

Bellocq becomes a fixture in the brothel, photographing the prostitutes, mostly Hattie. His activities fascinate the precocious Violet, though she believes he is falling in love with her mother, which makes her jealous. Violet is a restless child, frustrated by the long, precise process Bellocq must go through to compose and take pictures.

Nell decides that Violet is old enough for her virginity to be auctioned off. After a bidding war among regulars, Violet is bought by an apparently quiet customer. Hattie, meanwhile, aspires to escape prostitution. She marries a customer and leaves for St. Louis without her daughter, whom her husband believes to be her sister. Hattie promises to return for Violet, once she has settled and broken the news to her new spouse.

Violet runs away from the brothel after being punished for engaging in hijinks. She appears on Bellocq's doorstep and asks him if he will sleep with her and take care of her. He initially says no, but then he takes her in and commences having a sexual relationship with the child. In many ways, their relationship resembles one between a parent and child, with Bellocq standing in for Violet's absent mother. Bellocq even buys Violet a doll, telling her that "every child should have a doll". Bellocq is entranced by Violet's beauty, youth, and photogenic face. She is frustrated by Bellocq's devotion to his photography and lack of care for her as a dependent, as much as he is frustrated by the reality that she is a child.

Violet eventually returns to Nell's after quarreling with Bellocq, but social reform groups are forcing the brothels of Storyville to close. Bellocq arrives to wed Violet, ostensibly to protect her from the larger world.

Two weeks after the wedding, Hattie and her husband arrive from St. Louis to collect Violet, claiming that her marriage to Bellocq is illegal without their consent. Bellocq does not want to let Violet go. Violet asks if he will go with her and her family. Upon hearing that she does in fact want to go with them, he lets her leave without him, realizing that schooling and a more conventional life will benefit her greatly.

Cast

Production

Development
Screenwriter Polly Platt developed the idea for the film after meeting with Louis Malle and learning of his love of New Orleans jazz music, which was an integral part of the Storyville red-light district in the city in the early-twentieth century. Platt based the screenplay on the life of a young girl who was forced into prostitution by her mother, which was recounted in historian Al Rose's 1974 book Storyville, New Orleans: Being an Authentic Illustrated Account of the Notorious Red-Light District, as well as the life of photographer Ernest Bellocq, who photographed various New Orleans prostitutes in the early-twentieth century.

Casting
Following her acclaimed performance as a child prostitute in Taxi Driver (1976), the studio was keen on casting Jodie Foster as Violet. However, Malle rejected the idea as he thought the role should be played by a 12-year-old only, and Foster was 14. Brooke Shields, a child model who had made her film debut the year before in Alice, Sweet Alice (1976), met with Malle and the film's screenwriter, Polly Platt. She described her audition as consisting merely of a conversation with the two, in which they largely asked her questions about her life. To ensure that Shields was intellectually able to navigate the material, Malle and Platt also inquired if she was aware of what prostitution was. Shields, who had grown up in New York City and observed working prostitutes in Times Square, had been informed by her mother what prostitution entailed. 

Susan Sarandon, who was cast as Violet's mother, commented on Shields's casting in the role: "Brooke lived a life that was very similar [to that of her character]...  You know...  The closest thing to a child prostitute would be a child actor-model, in this day and age. Brooke was already an incredibly mature kid and I don't think it's any secret that she was...  asked to grow up very quickly."

Platt initially planned for the role of E. J. Bellocq to go to Jack Nicholson, but Malle denounced this. Instead, he offered the role to Keith Carradine, which Carradine was confused by as he bore no physical similarities to Bellocq.

Filming
Pretty Baby was shot on location in New Orleans over a period of four months in 1977. Due to its controversial subject matter, the production stated they  were "being very cautious because of the nature of the material and... following all the rules aimed at safeguarding child performers: teachers, psychological testing, parental cooperation and so forth."

Screenwriter Polly Platt stated that Malle insisted on continuous rehearsals throughout the shoot, which frustrated much of the cast and crew. Platt described Shields's mother, Teri, as "obstreprous" on the set, and claimed she was arrested by police for driving while intoxicated with her daughter in the car, as well as for punching a police officer in the face.

Shields maintained in later years that she "did not experience any distress or humiliation" while filming her nude scenes in the film. What she does remember was trying not to look as if "I'd just sucked on a lemon" before her on-screen kiss with 29-year-old Keith Carradine ("Keith was so kind," she writes) and being soundly slapped – on-screen and for real – by Susan Sarandon.

Commenting on the production, Malle stated: "Pretty Baby was harder than I expected, and in the meantime, I fell in love with America." After filming completed, Malle chose to become a U.S. resident, and remained there for the rest of his life.

Music

ABC Records released a soundtrack of the film's ragtime score, which was nominated for an Academy Award for Best Adaptation Score in the "Adaptation Score" category.

Release

Marketing
Despite Malle's concerted effort to make the film sanitized of explicit sex, it received significant salacious pre-publicity leading up to its release, including a lengthy article by Joan Goodman in New York Magazine, which described it as "Lolita, only in period costume and much more explicit." Further press attention came in the form of Shields's clothed appearance on the cover of Playboy in January 1978. Malle's brother, Vincent, commented that the film's pre-publicity was calculated by Malle and "absolutely deliberate. ..  It was not something imposed on him by Paramount." 

Film scholar and Malle biographer Nathan Southern wrote that Malle "realized that by leading viewers to expect "sophisticated kiddie porn," but carrying the film's content to the opposite extreme (inexplicitness), the contrast between audience expectations and onscreen realitythe power derived from the modernistic interplay of opposites within the framework of anticipationwould make the film's message of relativistic ethos that much clearer in the audience's mind."

According to critic Danny Peary, Pretty Baby was released at a period of "peak public outrage over child abuse, child pornography, and child prostitution, and its critics were right to be disappointed that Malle refused to portray Violet's life in a brother in a negative light...  The sledgehammer "selling of Brooke Shields as a pubescent sex symbol," which gained momentum because of the film, was truly tasteless. At least Malle didn't exploit his hot property as much as others did."

Controversy and censorship
The film received an R rating in the United States, an X rating in the United Kingdom (18 following a change to the ratings system) despite receiving two cuts from censors; and an R18+ rating in Australia, for nudity and sexual content.

Continuing controversy over Shields's nude scenes resulted in the film being banned in the Canadian provinces of Ontario and Saskatchewan until 1995. Gossip columnist Rona Barrett called the film "child pornography", and director Louis Malle was described as a "combination of Lolitas Humbert Humbert and (by that point) controversial director Roman Polanski". In Argentina, the film, along with another of Paramount's recent releases (Looking for Mr. Goodbar), was banned under the regime of Jorge Rafael Videla during that country's last civil/military dictatorship due in large part to the "pornographic" content that was present in both films. For five years, the film was also banned by the apartheid regime in South Africa.

Actress Sarandon reflected on the film's censorship in a later interview, commenting that the censors "were looking for something. The film was disturbing...  [yet] clearly when you look at it, it doesn't have anything graphic. Even at that time, it was pretty tame."

In addition to the issue of child prostitution, the scenes involving a nude 12-year-old Brooke Shields were controversial. The BBFC originally censored two scenes for the film's cinema release in the UK to remove nudity, but the uncut version was released on DVD in 2006. This same uncut print is the basis of the Region 1 and Region 2 DVD editions worldwide.

Home media
Paramount Home Entertainment released the film on DVD on November 18, 2003. In 2022, the Australian film label Imprint Films released it for the first time on Blu-ray in a special edition, which included an interview with Shields, in which she recalled shooting the film as well as its controversial reception. Kino Lorber announced in January 2023 the forthcoming release of a North American Blu-ray.

Reception

Box office 
Pretty Baby earned $5.8 million in the United States.

Critical response 
Pretty Baby divided critics at the time of its release. In his review for The New York Times, Vincent Canby wrote: "Mr. Malle, the French director ... has made some controversial films in his time but none, I suspect, that is likely to upset convention quite as much as this one – and mostly for the wrong reasons. Though the setting is a whorehouse, and the lens through which we see everything is Violet, who ... herself becomes one of Nell's chief attractions, Pretty Baby is neither about child prostitution nor is it pornographic." Canby ended his review with the claim that Pretty Baby is "... the most imaginative, most intelligent, and most original film of the year to date." Film critic Kenneth Turan praised Shields's performance as "chilling," but felt the film largely boasts a "flat, uninvolving directorial style...&nbsp Like its protagonist, Pretty Baby is something of a carnival attraction, nothing more."

Chicago Sun-Times critic Roger Ebert, who gave the film three stars out of four, discussed how "... Pretty Baby has been attacked in some quarters as child porn. It's not. It's an evocation of a time and a place and a sad chapter of Americana." He also praised Shields's performance, writing that she "... really creates a character here; her subtlety and depth are astonishing." 

On the other hand, Variety wrote that "the film is handsome, the players nearly all effective, but the story highlights are confined within a narrow range of ho-hum dramatization." Mountain Xpress critic Ken Hanke, looking at the film from the perspective of 2003, said of Pretty Baby: "It was once shocking and dull. Now it's just dull."

, review aggregator Rotten Tomatoes reports that 71% of 28 critics had given the film a favorable review, with a weighted average of 6.88/10.

Accolades
The film won the Technical Grand Prize at the 1978 Cannes Film Festival, and was nominated for the Palm d'Or. The film's original musical score by Ferdinand Morton's earned the film an Academy Award nomination for Best Music.

Legacy
While majoring in French literature at Princeton University, Shields went on to write her senior thesis, The Initiation: From Innocence to Experience: The Pre-Adolescent/Adolescent Journey in the Films of Louis Malle, Pretty Baby and Lacombe, Lucien (1987), comparing the themes of lost innocence in both films, as well as its role as a predominant theme across the director's filmography. A documentary entitled Pretty Baby: Brooke Shields, which charts the actress's career and partly focuses on the film's impact on her, premiered at the Sundance Film Festival in January 2023, ahead of a streaming release via Hulu in April 2023.

In 2003, The New York Times placed the film on its list of the Best 1,000 Movies Ever.

References

Sources

External links
 
 
 
 
 
 Making of Pretty Baby: Photo Gallery

1978 films
1978 directorial debut films
1978 drama films
1970s erotic drama films
1970s historical drama films
American erotic drama films
American historical drama films
1970s English-language films
Films about child prostitution
Films about prostitution in the United States
Films directed by Louis Malle
Films set in 1917
Films set in New Orleans
Films shot in New Orleans
Juvenile sexuality in films
Obscenity controversies in film
Paramount Pictures films
1970s American films